Étienne Draber (26 March 1939 – 11 January 2021) was a French actor.

Biography
Draber studied at CNSAD and worked alongside  and Jean-Louis Barrault in the 1960s. The father of actress , In the 1980s, Draber frequently appeared in French films. He acted in films such as Profs, The Under-Gifted, May Fools, and Ridicule.

Draber also appeared in television series. He played the role of Monsieur Grand-Coin du Toit in the 1994 sitcom Le Miel et les Abeilles. His most successful series appearance occurred in 2008 with Plus belle la vie.

Étienne Draber died of COVID-19 in Paris on 11 January 2021, at the age of 81, during the COVID-19 pandemic in France.

Filmography

Cinema
Les Baratineurs (1965)
Sexyrella (1968)
La Grande Maffia (1971)
The Inheritor (1973)
Cher Victor (1975)
Sept morts sur ordonnance (1975)
Le Plein de Super (1976)
Un oursin dans la poche (1977)
Le Sucre (1978)
La Frisée aux lardons (1978)
Les Grandissons (1978)
Et la tendresse ? Bordel ! (1978)
Les Charlots en délire (1979)
Les Turlupins (1979)
Gros-Câlin (1979)
Rendez-moi ma peau... (1980)
Je vais craquer (1980)
The Under-Gifted (1980)
Diva (1981)
Faut s'les faire ces légionnaires (1981)
Boulevard des assassins (1982)
Un dimanche de flic (1983)
Signes extérieurs de richesse (1983)
Le Fou du roi (1983)
Le Bon Plaisir (1984)
Les Brésiliennes du bois de Boulogne (1984)
Profs (1985)
Les Rois du gag (1985)
Y'a pas le feu... (1985)
Un amour à Paris (1986)
La Passion de Bernadette (1989)
May Fools (1990)
Madame Bovary (1991)
Les Ténors (1993)
Pétain (1993)
Les Grands Ducs (1995)
Beaumarchais (1995)
Ridicule (1996)
Les Bidochon (1996)
On Guard (1997)
Al limite (1997)
Épouse-moi (2000)
T'aime (2000)
Rue des plaisirs (2001)
Sept ans de mariage (2002)
Vipère au poing (2004)
House of D (2004)
My Best Friend (2006)
Coco (2009)
L'amour, c'est mieux à deux (2010)
J'ai perdu Albert (2018)

Short films
La Flache (1995)
Zanzibar (1998)
La Place du mort (1999)
Les Fourches caudines (1999)
Drame ordinaire (1999)
William sort de prison (2000)
Les Couilles de mon chat (2004)

Television
Les Jeunes Années (1965)
Cinéma 16 : L'Œil de l'autre (1977)
Louis XI ou Le pouvoir central(1979)
L'embrumé (1980)
Petit déjeuner compris (1980)
Le Mandarin (1980)
Arsène Lupin joue et perd (1980)
Commissaire Moulin (1982)
Le rêve d'Icare (1982)
Le village dans les nuages (1982)
Mariage blues (1983)
Battling le ténébreux (1984)
Châteauvallon (1985)
Les Cing Dernières Minutes (1985)
Marie Pervenche (1987)
Les grandes familles (1988)
Nick chasseur de têtes (1989)
Cas de divorce (1991)
Le gourou occidental (1991)
La squale (1991)
Regarde-moi quand je te quitte (1993)
Le Miel et les Abeilles (1994)
François Kléber (1995)
Maigret (1995)
Une fille à papas (1996)
L'École des passions (1996)
Sapho (1996)
Studio des Artistes (1997)
Juge et partie (1997)
La traque (1997)
Madame le Proviseur (1998)
Island détectives (1999)
H (1999)
Louis Page (2001)
Les Cordier, juge et flic (2001)
Le juge est une femme (2002)
La mort est rousse (2002)
Courrier du cœur (2003)
La Crim''' (2004)Quai numéro un (2004)SOS 18 (2005)Voltaire et l'affaire Calas (2007)Fargas (2007)Plus belle la vie (2008)La Minute vieille'' (2015)

References

1939 births
2021 deaths
French male film actors
Deaths from the COVID-19 pandemic in France
20th-century French male actors
21st-century French male actors
French male television actors
Actors from Strasbourg